The Society for Economic Botany is an international learned society covering the field of economic botany. It was established in 1959. In 2022 the Society voted to change its name to the Society for Ethnobotany, going into effect in June 2023. Its official journal is Economic Botany, published on their behalf by Springer Science+Business Media and the New York Botanical Garden Press. The society also publishes a biannual newsletter, Plants and People. The society organizes annual meetings at different locations around the world, where it awards the prize of Distinguished Economic Botanist to particularly meritorious individuals.

Distinguished Economic Botanist prize
In 2022 the Society voted to change the name of this award to the Distinguished Ethnobotanist award, going into effect in June 2023. Recent recipients of the Distinguished Economic Botanist prize include:

Past Presidents
Past presidents of the society include:

References

External links

Botany organizations
Scientific organizations established in 1959
International scientific organizations